The list of ship commissionings in 1949 includes a chronological list of ships commissioned in 1949.

See also

References 

1949
 Ship commissionings